Umari is a village and former non-salute princely state in Gujarat, western India.

History 
The Seventh Class princely state and taluka, covering only the village, in Mahi Kantha, was ruled by Kshatriya Chauhan Koli Chieftains, within the jurisdiction of Gandhwada Thana.

In 1901 it had a population of 1,021, yielding 565 Rupees state revenue (1903-4, mostly from land), contributing to the tributes due to the Gaekwar Baroda State viz. to Idar State by Satlasna and Bhalusana, to which Umari and Mota Kothasana were subject.

References

External links and sources 
 Imperial Gazetteer, on DSAL.UChicago.edu - Mahi Kantha

Princely states of Gujarat
Koli princely states